Scapozygocera is a genus of longhorn beetles of the subfamily Lamiinae found in New Guinea, and contains the following species:

Scapozygocera ochreifrons Breuning, 1965
Scapozygocera quadriplagiata Breuning, 1947

References

Zygocerini